Bridgerton is a series of eight Regency romance novels written by Julia Quinn. Released from 2000 to 2006, it follows the eight siblings of the noble Bridgerton family as they navigate London high society in search of love, adventure and happiness. 

The novels have been adapted by Shondaland into a television series titled Bridgerton which premiered in 2020 on Netflix.

Background 
Set between 1813 and 1827, each novel features one of the eight children of the late Viscount Bridgerton and his widow Violet: Anthony, who is the current Viscount Bridgerton, Benedict, Colin, Daphne, Eloise, Francesca, Gregory, and Hyacinth. The Bridgerton family are part of British nobility and are a well respected, immensely loving, and tight-knit clan favored among high society.

Publishing history 
The Duke and I (2000, Daphne's Story)
 The Viscount Who Loved Me (2000, Anthony's Story)
 An Offer from a Gentleman (2001, Benedict's Story)
 Romancing Mister Bridgerton (2002, Colin's Story)
 To Sir Phillip, With Love (2003, Eloise's Story)
 When He Was Wicked (2004, Francesca's Story)
 It's In His Kiss (2005, Hyacinth's Story)
 On the Way to the Wedding (2006, Gregory's Story)

Characters

Bridgerton family tree

Appearances

Reception

Critical response 
People ranked The Viscount Who Loved Me, a perennial fan favorite, as the best book of the Bridgerton series for its enemies-to-lovers trope "full of banter and chemistry" with character development for the central couple, "both as a pair and on their own."

The Duke and I was criticized for the inclusion of non-consensual sex between Simon and Daphne which amounted to marital rape. Critics pointed out that it failed to acknowledge the difficulties of male victims of rape, especially since Simon was traumatized after the event.

On the Way to the Wedding won the Romance Writers of America RITA Award in 2007. In 2002, To Sir Phillip, With Love was named one of the six best mass market original novels of the year by Publishers Weekly.

Sales 
Well-received when they were first published, the novels received a surge on book sales when the Netflix series Bridgerton premiered its first season in December 2020, and again, for its second season in March 2022. Several titles in the series have been on The New York Times bestseller list, including at several weeks #1 with The Duke and I and The Viscount Who Loved Me.

Adaptations 

The book series has been adapted by Shondaland, for Netflix, into a television series titled Bridgerton which premiered on the platform in 2020. It follows the format of the novels, with each season focusing on a different Bridgerton sibling, and their quest for marriage.

References

External links
 Official Bridgerton Series Website
 Official Bridgerton Series Character List
 Official Bridgerton Family Tree

 

 
Novel series
Series of books
Book series introduced in 2000
Romance novel series
Love stories